Parris is both a given name and surname. Notable people with the name include:

Given name
 Parris Afton Bonds, American novelist
 Parris Campbell (born 1997), American football player
 Parris Duffus (born 1970), retired American ice hockey goaltender
 Parris Glendening (born 1942), American politician
 Parris Goebel (born 1991), New Zealand-born choreographer, director, singer, dancer, actress of Samoan descent
 Parris Mosteller (born 2001), American child actor

Surname
In arts and entertainment:
 Amanda Parris, Canadian broadcaster and writer
 Edmund Thomas Parris (1793–1873), English painter
 Patricia Parris (born 1950), American voice actress
 Rachel Parris (born 1984), British comedian and musician 
 Rebecca Parris (1951-2018), American singer
 Robert Parris (1924-1999), American composer
 S. J. Parris, pseudonym of English author Stephanie Merritt
 Teyonah Parris (born 1987), American actress

In politics:
 Albion K. Parris (1788–1857), American politician and jurist of Maine, United States Representative and Senator
 Matthew Parris (born 1949), journalist and former Conservative politician in the United Kingdom
 Stanford Parris (1929–2010), American politician, United States Representative, Virginia state delegate, and Virginia Secretary of the Commonwealth 
 Virgil D. Parris (1807–1874), American politician and jurist of Maine, United States Representative and President of the Maine Senate

In the Salem witch trials:
 Betty Parris (1682–1760), nine-year-old daughter of the Salem villages' reverend Samuel Parris
 Samuel Parris (1653–1720), Puritan minister in the town of Salem Village during the Salem witch trials

In other fields:
 Alexander Parris (1780–1852), prominent American architect-engineer
 Eddie Parris (1911–1971), Welsh international footballer
 Francis Sawyer Parris (1707–1760), Biblical scholar
 John Parris (born 1952), English cue maker
 Nikita Parris (born 1994), English association footballer
 Bob Moses (activist) (1935–2021), Harvard-trained educator who joined the civil rights movement and later founded the nationwide US Algebra project
 Steve Parris (born 1967), former professional baseball pitcher
 Timon Parris (born 1995), American football player

See also
 Paris (surname)
 Paris (given name)

English-language unisex given names